We Sicilians  is a political party active in Sicily.

History
The Federation for the Self-Determination of Sicily "We Sicilians" (Federazione per l'Autodeterminazione della Sicilia "Noi Siciliani") was founded by Erasmo Vecchio in December 1994.

In 1996 it formed an alliance with the Sicilian National Front led by Giuseppe Scianò. 

The party contested the 1996 Sicilian regional elections and managed to win a seat with 1.7% of the vote.

In the 2001 Sicilian regional election it was part was part of the centre-left coalition that supported the candidacy of Leoluca Orlando but fell to 0.1% of the votes and lost the only seat it held in the Sicilian Regional Assembly.

Electoral results

Italian Parliament

Sicilian Regional Assembly

References

Political parties in Sicily
Political parties established in 2001
2001 establishments in Italy